Rhein-Nahe is a Verbandsgemeinde ("collective municipality") in the district Mainz-Bingen, in Rhineland-Palatinate, Germany. It is situated along the left bank of the Rhine, north of Bingen. Bingen is the seat of the municipality, but not part of it.

The Verbandsgemeinde Rhein-Nahe consists of the following Ortsgemeinden ("local municipalities"):

Bacharach
Breitscheid
Manubach
Münster-Sarmsheim
Niederheimbach
Oberdiebach
Oberheimbach
Trechtingshausen
Waldalgesheim
Weiler bei Bingen

Verbandsgemeinde in Rhineland-Palatinate